Mohamed Ashraf (born 20 May 1993), commonly known as Roqa, is an Egyptian professional footballer who plays as a midfielder for Egyptian Premier League side Zamalek SC.

Honours

Club
Zamalek SC
Egyptian Premier League: 2020-21
Egypt Cup: 2017_18 , 2021

References

External links
 Mohamed Ashraf at Footballdatabase
 

1995 births
Living people
Egyptian footballers
Egyptian Premier League players
Petrojet SC players
Tala'ea El Gaish SC players
Zamalek SC players
ENPPI SC players
Association football midfielders